Imprenta y fundición tipográfica Richard Gans was a type foundry in business from 1888–1975. Founder, Richard Gans was the son of a doctor from Karlsbad, Austria who emigrated to Spain in 1874 where he founded the business in 1888.  After his death in 1925 the foundry was led by Mauricio Wiesenthal until 1936.  In the 1920s and 30s, Gans types were sold in the United States by Continental Type Founders Association.

Richard Gans' children, Ricardo, Manuel and Amalia Gans Gimeno took over operations in 1936, but Ricardo and Manuel were assassinated in the Civil War only a few months later.  During the war the foundry was used to make ammunition.  Amalia Gans rebuilt the business after the war, and remained in charge until the business closed in 1975.

Type Design
Before 1925, the foundry cast almost no original types, taking designs from German foundries, principally those of the Woellmer Type Foundry and Edmund Koch. Later types were designed by a number of people from within and outside the foundry including Jose Ausejo Matute, Antonio Bilbao, the founder's son Ricardo Gans, and Carlos Winkow.

Typefaces

Exported Typefaces
 Atlantida
 Dalia (1931),  known as Ibarra Vaciada in Spain.
 Egipcia Progreso (1923)
 Gloria (c. 1930), known in Spain as Fulgor.
 Greco (1925), sold in Spain as Antigua El Greco, also sold by Stevens, Shanks & Sons Ltd. as Bristol and Rosart.
 Ibarra (1931, Carlos Winkow), known in Spain as Elzeviriano Ibarra, digitized in 2011 by Lucia Walter.
 Italiana Cursiva (1951)
 Juventud (1950, Joan Trochut-Blanchard), known in Spain as Escritura Juventud, released by Française as Muriel, digitized by Canada Type as Blanchard.
 Progresso (1923)

Typefaces Sold Only In Spain

References

Sources

Jaspert, W. Pincus, W. Turner Berry and A.F. Johnson. The Encyclopedia of Type Faces. Blandford Press Lts.: 1953, 1983. .
Friedl, Ott, and Stein, Typography: an Encyclopedic Survey of Type Design and Techniques Throughout History. Black Dog & Levinthal Publishers: 1998. .

External links

Letterpress font foundries of Spain
Manufacturing companies based in Madrid
Manufacturing companies established in 1888
Design companies established in 1888